The XPW World Heavyweight Championship is a professional wrestling world heavyweight championship in the Xtreme Pro Wrestling promotion. Masada is the current champion in his first reign. He won the title by defeating Brian Cage and Willie Mack at Night of Reckoning on August 13, 2022 in Pomona, California.

Title history
Sabu's reign is the longest at 392 days, while Jake Lawless has shortest reign at less than a day.

Combined reigns 

References

External links
XPW World Heavyweight Championship Title History at Cagematch.net

World heavyweight wrestling championships
Xtreme Pro Wrestling championships